= D-Jay =

Namibian hip-hop artist

D-jay
- Born: Diogene Ochs; August 21, 1987 (age 39); Windhoek, Namibia
- Citizenship: Namibia
- Occupations: Musician; rapper; record producer; performer; entertainer; socialite
- Musical career
- Also known as: Favorite Rapper
- Genres: Hip hop, Crunk, Rap,
- Instrument: Vocals
- Years active: 2005-present
- Label: Champion Music

Diogene Ochs (born August 21, 1987, in Windhoek, Namibia) better known by his stage name D-Jay, is a Namibian hip hop artist.
